Sany Joseph is an Indian athlete. She won a gold medal in  4 × 400 m relay and a silver medal in the 4  × 100 m relay in the 1987 Asian Athletics Championships.She won a silver medal in the  4  × 100 m relay in the 1989 Asian Athletics Championships.

References

Living people
South Asian Games gold medalists for India
South Asian Games medalists in athletics
Indian female sprinters
Year of birth missing (living people)